The theme of the notes is bridges of Denmark and ancient Danish artifacts found in the vicinity of the bridges. Danish artist Karin Birgitte Lund was selected to design the 2009 series after a competition. The competition specified the bridges theme as mandatory, and it was her idea to include the artifacts on the reverse side.

The sizes of the 2009 bank notes are identical to the 1997 bank notes, in order to avoid alterations to automated teller machines. The height is 72 millimetres and the lengths are from 125 mm to 165 mm, increasing by 10 mm for each new value.

The 50-krone banknote 

Issued on 11 August 2009.

Features the Sallingsund Bridge of 1978 and the Skarpsalling Vessel (clay) dating from around 3200 BC.
This denomination features the word "halvtreds" (halvtredsindstyve = half-third times 20 = half of the third times 20 = 2½ × 20 = fifty) instead of "femti" which was used on the previous series 50 DKK notes ("femti" (five 10s) was usually for reasons of convenience written on cheques).

The 100-krone banknote 
 
Issued on 4 May 2010.

Features the Old Little Belt Bridge of 1935 and the Hindsgavl Dagger dating from 1900 to 1700 BC.

The 200-krone banknote 
 
Issued on 19 October 2010.

Features the Knippelsbro (Knippel's Bridge) of 1937 and the Langstrup Belt Plate from the early Bronze Age, approximately 1400 BC.

The 500-krone banknote 
 
Issued on 15 February 2011.

Features the Queen Alexandrine Bridge of 1943 and the Keldby Vessel (bronze) from the 4th or early 3rd century BC.

The 1000-krone banknote 
 
Issued on 24 May 2011.

Features the Great Belt Bridge of 1998 and the Trundholm Sun Chariot from the early Bronze Age, approximately 1400 BC.

References

 Danmarks Nationalbank's description of the banknotes

Banknotes of Denmark